Beresford Stanley "Beres" Reilly (17 September 1914 – 23 July 1943) was an Australian rules footballer who played for the North Melbourne Football Club, Melbourne Football Club and St Kilda Football Club in the Victorian Football League (VFL).

Family
The third of the five children of William John Reilly (1882-1964), and Winifred Frances Reilly (1886-1964), née Knopp, Beresford Stanley Reilly was born at South Melbourne, Victoria on 17 September 1914.

He married Mary Margaret Purves on 4 January 1941.

Football
Representing a Victorian schoolboys team, he tried out for the Footscray Football Club. He wasn't given a game and as such moved on to North Melbourne.

Military service
He was a good friend of Keith Truscott, who was also killed in World War II. Serving as a Pilot Officer in the RAAF, Reilly was killed when his Martin Baltimore aircraft crashed over Crete. All 4 on board died in the crash.

See also
 List of Victorian Football League players who died in active service

Notes

References

 Holmesby, Russell & Main, Jim (2007). The Encyclopedia of AFL Footballers. 7th ed. Melbourne: Bas Publishing.
 Main, J. & Allen, D., "Reilly, Beresford", pp.323-326 in Main, J. & Allen, D., Fallen – The Ultimate Heroes: Footballers Who Never Returned From War, Crown Content, (Melbourne), 2002. 
 World War Two Nominal Roll: Pilot Officer Beresford Stanley Reilly (401583), Department of Veterans' Affairs.
 World War Two Service Record: Pilot Officer Beresford Stanley Reilly (401583), National Archives of Australia.
 World War Two Casualty/Repatriation Record: Pilot Officer Beresford Stanley Reilly (401583), National Archives of Australia.
 Australian War Memorial Roll of Honour: Pilot Officer Beresford Stanley Reilly (401583).

External links
 
 
 Beres Reilly, at Demonwiki

1914 births
1943 deaths
North Melbourne Football Club players
Melbourne Football Club players
St Kilda Football Club players
Royal Australian Air Force officers
Australian military personnel killed in World War II
Royal Australian Air Force personnel of World War II
Australian rules footballers from Melbourne
Victims of aviation accidents or incidents in 1943
Victims of aviation accidents or incidents in Greece